Quincy Lavell Lewis (born June 26, 1977) is an American former professional basketball player who last played with the pro club Iurbentia Bilbao Basket in Spain.  He currently works as an analyst for Fox Sports North, covering the Minnesota Timberwolves, one of Lewis's former NBA teams. Now coaches the AAU 16u basketball team “Minnesota Heat”.

College career
Lewis played college basketball for the University of Minnesota. In 1997 Lewis was the team's 6th man and helped the Golden Gophers reach the NCAA Final Four. He was the Big Ten Conference's leading scorer during his senior year in college. At the end of his college career, he ranked sixth in Minnesota's career scoring list, with 1,614 points. He also recorded 127 three-point field goals and 502 rebounds.

Professional career
He was selected by the Utah Jazz in the 1st round (19th pick) of the 1999 NBA Draft. He played for the Jazz from 1999–2002.

He was signed by the Minnesota Timberwolves as a free agent on September 26, 2003 for the 2003–04 season, and he was waived on December 20. He played with Maccabi Tel Aviv in Israel in 2002–03.

References

External links
NBA.com: Quincy Lewis Bio
EurocupBasketball.com Profile

1977 births
Living people
African-American basketball players
All-American college men's basketball players
American expatriate basketball people in Greece
American expatriate basketball people in Israel
American expatriate basketball people in Spain
American men's basketball players
Basketball players from Arkansas
Bilbao Basket players
CB Lucentum Alicante players
Goodwill Games medalists in basketball
Liga ACB players
Minnesota Golden Gophers men's basketball players
Minnesota Timberwolves players
Shooting guards
Small forwards
Sportspeople from Little Rock, Arkansas
Utah Jazz draft picks
Utah Jazz players
Competitors at the 1998 Goodwill Games
21st-century African-American sportspeople
20th-century African-American sportspeople